"It's My Turn" is a song sung by American singer Diana Ross as the theme to the film It's My Turn. With lyrics written by Carole Bayer Sager, and Michael Masser composing and producing, the song was released in September 1980 by Motown as the lead single from the film's soundtrack. It was also the first single on Ross's compilation, To Love Again (1981). In the United States, the single peaked at number 9 on both the Billboard Hot 100 and Adult Contemporary charts, and it rose to number 14 on the Soul chart.

Chart performance

References

External links
 

Diana Ross songs
1980s ballads
1980 singles
1980 songs
Songs with feminist themes
Songs written by Carole Bayer Sager
Songs written by Michael Masser
Songs written for films
Motown singles